Pomare  is a south-western suburb of Rotorua in the Bay of Plenty Region of New Zealand's North Island. Rotorua International Stadium is on the eastern side of  Pomare.

Demographics

Pomare had a population of 1,713 at the 2018 New Zealand census, an increase of 141 people (9.0%) since the 2013 census, and an increase of 219 people (14.7%) since the 2006 census. There were 597 households, comprising 849 males and 870 females, giving a sex ratio of 0.98 males per female. The median age was 40.8 years (compared with 37.4 years nationally), with 360 people (21.0%) aged under 15 years, 288 (16.8%) aged 15 to 29, 771 (45.0%) aged 30 to 64, and 294 (17.2%) aged 65 or older.

Ethnicities were 74.6% European/Pākehā, 30.1% Māori, 4.2% Pacific peoples, 7.5% Asian, and 2.1% other ethnicities. People may identify with more than one ethnicity.

The percentage of people born overseas was 16.3, compared with 27.1% nationally.

Although some people chose not to answer the census's question about religious affiliation, 48.9% had no religion, 41.2% were Christian, 1.6% had Māori religious beliefs, 1.2% were Hindu, 0.4% were Buddhist and 1.8% had other religions.

Of those at least 15 years old, 273 (20.2%) people had a bachelor's or higher degree, and 225 (16.6%) people had no formal qualifications. The median income was $35,600, compared with $31,800 nationally. 258 people (19.1%) earned over $70,000 compared to 17.2% nationally. The employment status of those at least 15 was that 708 (52.3%) people were employed full-time, 222 (16.4%) were part-time, and 45 (3.3%) were unemployed.

References

Suburbs of Rotorua
Populated places in the Bay of Plenty Region